Neap is a small village in the east coast of the Mainland of the Shetland Islands, Scotland. Neap is situated at the end of the road from Brettabister, through Housabister and Kirkabister.

References

External links

Canmore - Brettabister, Neap Old Manse site record
Canmore - Nor: Ura, South Nesting Bay site record
Canmore - G S L: Nesting Bay, North Sea site record

Villages in Mainland, Shetland